The men's 4 × 100 metre freestyle relay competition of the swimming events at the 1991 Pan American Games took place on 16 August. The last Pan American Games champion was the United States.

This race consisted of eight lengths of the pool. Each of the four swimmers completed two lengths of the pool. The first swimmer had to touch the wall before the second could leave the starting block.

Brazil's victory in the men's 4x100m freestyle relay was only the second time that the U.S. lost the gold in a relay event, at the Pan American Games. The first had been to Canada in women's 4x100m medley at the 1971 Pan American Games.

Results
All times are in minutes and seconds.

Heats

Final 
The final was held on August 16.

References

Swimming at the 1991 Pan American Games